Ivanauskas is the masculine form of a Lithuanian family name. It corresponds to the Russian surname Ivanovsky and Polish surname Iwanowski. Its feminine forms  are: Ivanauskienė (married woman or widow) and Ivanauskaitė (unmarried woman).

The surname may refer to:

Jurga Ivanauskaitė (1961–2007), Lithuanian writer
Rapolas Ivanauskas (born 1998) is a Lithuanian basketball player
Tadas Ivanauskas (1882–1970), Lithuanian  zoologist and biologist
Valdas Ivanauskas (born 1966, Lithuanian football (soccer) player and coach
Sofija Ivanauskaitė (1867–1926), birth name of Sofija Pšibiliauskienė, Lithuanian  writer
Marija Ivanauskaitė (1872–1957), birth name of Marija Lastauskienė, Lithuanian writer

Lithuanian-language surnames